The 1899 Pacific Tigers football team represented the University of the Pacific as an independent during the 1899 college football season.

Schedule

References

Pacific
Pacific Tigers football seasons
College football winless seasons
Pacific Tigers football